The Brown Wallet is a 1936 British crime film, directed by Michael Powell and starring Patric Knowles.  The Brown Wallet, adapted from a short story by Stacy Aumonier, was one of over 20 quota quickies directed by Powell between 1931 and 1936.  It is among eleven of these films of which no extant print is known to survive, and its current status is "missing, believed lost".

Plot
Publisher John Gillespie (Patric Knowles) faces a financial crisis after his business partner skips town with all the firm's assets.  Facing ruin, he reluctantly approaches a wealthy aunt for assistance but is met with a stony-faced refusal.  Returning home in a taxi, he finds a wallet containing £2,000 left behind by a previous passenger.  He takes the wallet, but rather than confiding in his wife he rents a room in which he secretes the money, telling her he needs the room for business purposes.

Shortly afterwards his aunt is found murdered, with her safe having been broken into and robbed.  Gillespie is the prime suspect, and wary of incriminating himself with regard to the £2,000 and unwilling to face having to surrender the cash, his story is deemed unsatisfactory and he is arrested and charged with murder.  However, a former employee of his aunt makes his own investigation into the case and discovers the real culprit.  Gillespie is released, then discovers he has been bequeathed a large sum of money in his aunt's will.  He can then return the wallet and the £2,000 to its rightful owner.

Cast
 Patric Knowles as John Gillespie
 Nancy O'Neil as Eleanor
 Henry Caine as Simmonds
 Henrietta Watson as Aunt Mary
 Charlotte Leigh as Miss Barton
 Shayle Gardner as Wotherspoone
 Edward Dalby as Minting
 Eliot Makeham as Hobday
 Bruce Winston as Julian Thorpe
 Jane Millican as Miss Bloxham

References

External links 
 
 
 

1936 films
1936 crime films
British crime films
Films directed by Michael Powell
Films by Powell and Pressburger
Lost British films
British black-and-white films
1930s English-language films
1936 lost films
Lost crime films
1930s British films